is a 1989 Japanese science fiction action comedy original video animation (OVA) series. It's based on a novel series by Chōhei Kambayashi.

Plot
The action anime centers about Apulo, a cat-type alien detective from the Pirate Division, and his colleague Raul Latell Satoru, along with the Al-equipped frigate Lagendra, who pursue the largest pirate in the solar system, Youmei Shalom Tsuzakki.

Characters
Raul Latell-Satoru
Apullo

Releases
It was released on VHS, Laserdisc and DVD in Japan and on VHS in the United Kingdom.

Reception
On Anime News Network, Justin Sevakis called the original Japanese version "bland and inoffensive", saying he "can't imagine anyone hating it, but nobody's going to really enjoy it today".

References

External links

Action anime and manga
Comedy anime and manga
Madhouse (company)
Production I.G
Science fiction anime and manga